There are hundreds of chicken breeds in existence. Domesticated for thousands of years, distinguishable breeds of chicken have been present since the combined factors of geographical isolation and selection for desired characteristics created regional types with distinct physical and behavioral traits passed on to their offspring.

The physical traits used to distinguish chicken breeds are size, plumage color, comb type, skin color, number of toes, amount of feathering, egg color, and place of origin. They are also roughly divided by primary use, whether for eggs, meat, or ornamental purposes, and with some considered to be dual-purpose.

In the 21st century, chickens are frequently bred according to predetermined breed standards set down by governing organizations. The first of such standards was the British Poultry Standard, which is still in publication today. Other standards include the Standard of Perfection, the Australian Poultry Standard, and the standard of the American Bantam Association, which deals exclusively with bantam fowl. Only some of the known breeds are included in these publications, and only those breeds are eligible to be shown competitively. There are additionally a few hybrid strains which are common in the poultry world, especially in large poultry farms. These types are first generation crosses of true breeds. Hybrids do not reliably pass on their features to their offspring, but are highly valued for their producing abilities.



By place of origin

Afghanistan

Albania

Australia

Austria

Belgium

Brazil

Bulgaria

Canada

Chile
 Araucana

China

Croatia
 Hrvatica (Croatian Hen, Kokoš Hrvatica)

Cuba

 Cubalaya

Cyprus
Cypriot chicken

Czech Republic

Egypt

Finland

France

Germany

Large breeds

Bantams

Greece

Iceland
 Icelandic chicken

India

Indonesia

Iran

 Black Azerbaijan   Marandi

Italy

Japan

Korea
Jangmigye

Kosovo
Kosova Long-crowing

Malaysia
 Kampung
 Malay
 Serama

Mariana Islands
 Saipan Jungle Fowl

Myanmar
 Burmese
 Pama Game

Netherlands

Norway
 Norwegian Jærhøne

Pakistan

Philippines

 Banaba
 Bolinao
 Camarines
 Darag
 Paraoakan or Parawakan

Poland
 Polbar
 Zielononóżka Kuropatwiana (Green-legged Partridge)
 Polish chicken

Portugal

Romania

 Transylvanian Naked-neck

Russia

Serbia

Slovakia
 Oravka

Slovenia

South Africa

Spain

Sweden

Switzerland

Taiwan
 Taiwanese Game

Thailand
 Gai Chon
 Gai Puen Muang
 Pradu Hang Dum or Pradu Hang Dam Chiangmai
 Thai Game

Turkey

Ukraine
 Poltava

United Kingdom

United States of America

Vietnam

By primary use
All chickens lay eggs, have edible meat, and possess a unique appearance. However, distinct breeds are the result of selective breeding to emphasize certain traits. Any breed may be used for general agricultural purposes, and all breeds are shown to some degree. But each chicken breed is known for a primary use.

Eggs

Many breeds were selected and are used primarily for producing eggs, these are mostly light-weight birds whose hens do not go broody often.

Meat
Most farms and homesteads use dual-purpose breeds for meat production. Some breeds are raised mainly for meat:

Dual-purpose

The generalist breeds used in barnyards worldwide are adaptable utility birds good at producing both meat and eggs. Though some may be slightly better for one of these purposes, they are usually called dual-purpose breeds.

Exhibition
Since the 19th century, poultry fancy, the breeding and competitive exhibition of poultry as a hobby, has grown to be a huge influence on chicken breeds. Many breeds have always been kept for ornamental purposes, and others have been shifted from their original use to become first and foremost exhibition fowl, even if they may retain some inherent utility. Since the sport of cockfighting has been outlawed in the developed world, most breeds first developed for this purpose, called game fowl, are now seen principally in the show ring rather than the cock pit as fighting cocks.

Bantams

Most large chicken breeds have a bantam counterpart, sometimes referred to as a miniature. Miniatures are usually one-fifth to one-quarter the size of the standard breed, but they are expected to exhibit all of the standard breed's characteristics. A true bantam has no large counterpart, and is naturally small. The true bantams include:

Crossbreeds

Many common strains of crossbred chickens exist, but none breed true or are recognized by poultry breed standards; thus, though they are extremely common in flocks focusing on high productivity, crossbreeds do not technically meet the definition of a breed. Most crossbreed strains are sex linked, allowing for easy chick sexing.

See also 
 List of birds
 List of duck breeds
 List of goose breeds
 List of turkey breeds
 Chickens as pets

Footnotes

References

 Carol Ekarius (2007). Storey's Illustrated Guide to Poultry Breeds. North Adams, Massachusetts: Storey Publishing. .
 
 

 
Chickens
Chicken